Kuntillet Ajrud is a late 9th/early 8th centuries BCE site in the northeast part of the Sinai Peninsula. It is frequently described as a shrine, though this is not certain.

Excavations

Kuntillet Ajrud (Arabic كونتيلة عجرود) is in north Sinai; carbon-14 dating indicates occupation in the period 801–770 BCE, and the texts may have been written c.800 BCE. As a perennial water source in this arid region it constituted an important station on an ancient trade route connecting the Gulf of Aqaba (an inlet of the Red Sea) and the Mediterranean, and was in addition located only 50 kilometers from the major oasis of Kadesh Barnea.

The site then known as "Contellet Garaiyeh", was identified in 1869 by Edward Henry Palmer as "Gypsaria" on the Tabula Peutingeriana: "Our own route, however, from Contellet Garaiyeh to the ruins in Lussan, was, as may be seen from the map, within a mile or so of the distance between Gypsaria and Lysa; and our discovery at the first-mentioned place of the remains of an ancient fort, renders its identity with the third station on the list more than probable."

The site was excavated in 1975/76 by Tel Aviv University archaeologist , and the excavation report was published in 2012. The fortress-like main building is divided into two rooms, one large and the other small, both with low benches. Both rooms contained various paintings and inscriptions on the walls and on two large water-jars (pithoi), one found in each room. 

The paintings on the pithoi show various animals, stylised trees, and human figures, some of which may represent gods. They appear to have been done over a fairly considerable period and by several different artists, and do not form coherent scenes. The iconography is entirely Syrian/Phoenician and lacks any connection to the Egyptian models commonly found in Iron Age IIB Israel art.

The Kuntillet Ajrud inscriptions discovered in the excavations are significant in biblical archaeology.

See also
Khirbet el-Qom
Asherah

References

Citations

Bibliography 

 * 
 
 
 

 
 
 

Sinai Peninsula
Archaeological sites in Egypt
Ancient Jewish settlements
Populated places established in the 9th century BC
Populated places disestablished in the 8th century BC
Yahweh
Asherah